Incheon Nat'l Univ. Station is a subway station on Line 1 of the Incheon Subway in Yeonsu-gu, Incheon, South Korea. It has four exits connecting it to Incheon National University, nearby hotels, and the east side of Songdo Central Park.

Station layout

Neighborhood 
 Songdo Convensia
 Benikea Premier Songdo Bridge Hotel
 Best Western Songdo Park Hotel
 Central Park
 Songdo International City Cathedral
 Songdo Bus Transfer Center (located in Tomorrow City)
 Songdo 1-dong Administrative Welfare Center
 Sheraton Incheon Hotel
 Incheon National University
 Jack Nicklaus Golf Club
 Tomorrow City

References

Metro stations in Incheon
Seoul Metropolitan Subway stations
Railway stations opened in 2009
Yeonsu District